A.k.a. Cassius Clay (styled as a.k.a. Cassius Clay) is a 1970 boxing documentary film about the former heavyweight champion Muhammad Ali.

Directed by Jimmy Jacobs, the film was made during Ali's exile from the sport for refusing to be inducted into the US Army on religious grounds. Narrated by Richard Kiley, the film gives an overview of Ali's career to that point. The film features archival footage of people associated with Ali, such as Angelo Dundee, Malcolm X, and Drew Bundini Brown, and clips of his fights with Sonny Liston, Henry Cooper, George Chuvalo and Floyd Patterson. These are intercut with scenes featuring Ali and veteran boxing trainer Cus D'Amato discussing his career and how he would have fared against past champions such as Joe Louis.

Reception
The film opened at number two at the US box office behind Sunflower with a gross of $277,500 from 55 theaters.

References

External links
 
 
 
 New York Times review

1970 documentary films
1970 films
Documentary films about boxing
United Artists films
1970s English-language films
Films about Muhammad Ali
Documentary films about African Americans
Documentary films about sportspeople
Films directed by Jimmy Jacobs (handballer)
1970s American films